Schizomus is a genus of hubbardiid short-tailed whipscorpions, first described by Orator Cook in 1899.

Species 
, the World Schizomida Catalog accepts the following twenty-four species:

 Schizomus africanus (Hansen, 1905) – Sierra Leone
 Schizomus arganoi Brignoli, 1973 – Mexico
 Schizomus brevicaudus (Hansen, 1921) – Guinea-Bissau
 Schizomus cambridgei (Thorell, 1889) – Myanmar
 Schizomus crassicaudatus (O. Pickard-Cambridge, 1872) – Sri Lanka, Introduced to France
 Schizomus formicoides Fernando, 1957 – Sri Lanka
 Schizomus ghesquierei (Giltay, 1935) – Congo
 Schizomus greeni Gravely, 1912 – Sri Lanka
 Schizomus hanseni Mello-Leitão, 1931 – Tanzania
 Schizomus kharagpurensis Gravely, 1912 – India
 Schizomus mediocriter Lawrence, 1969 – Tanzania
 Schizomus modestus (Hansen, 1905) – Malaysia, Papua New Guinea
 Schizomus montanus Hansen, 1910 – Congo, Tanzania
 Schizomus nidicola Lawrence, 1969 – Congo
 Schizomus parvus (Hansen, 1921) – Cameroon, Equatorial Guinea, Gabon, São Tomé and Príncipe
 Schizomus pauliani Lawrence, 1969 – Comoros
 Schizomus perplexus Gravely, 1915 – Sri Lanka
 Schizomus peteloti (Rémy, 1946) – Vietnam
 Schizomus procerus (Hansen, 1905) – Singapore
 Schizomus schoutedeni (Roewer, 1954) – Congo
 Schizomus tenuipes Lawrence, 1969 – Mauritius (Rodrigues)
 Schizomus vinsoni Lawrence, 1969 – Mauritius
 Schizomus virescens Lawrence, 1969 – Mauritius (Rodrigues)
 Schizomus vittatus Gravely, 1911 – Sri Lanka

References 

Schizomida genera